2010 UEFA European Under-17 Football Championship (Elite Round) was the second round of qualifications for the final tournament of UEFA U-17 Championship 2010.
The Elite round was played between March 17 and April 1, 2010. The 28 teams advancing from the qualifying round were distributed into seven groups of four teams each, with each group being contested in a round-robin format, with one of the four teams hosting all six group games. The seven group-winning teams automatically qualified for the final tournament in Liechtenstein. The host nation was guaranteed one of the eight final tournament spots, but since Liechtenstein withdrew, the eight team to qualify was chosen from the second-placed teams with the best record against the first and third placed teams in its group.

Each team was placed in one of four drawing pots, according to their qualifying round results. The seven sides with the best records were placed in Pot A, and so forth until Pot D, which contained the seven teams with the weakest records. During the draw, each group was filled with one team from every pot, with the only restriction being that teams that played each other in the first qualifying round could not be drawn into the same group again. The draw was conducted December 7, 2009.

The hosts of the seven one-venue mini-tournament groups are indicated below in italics.

Stages

Group 1

Czech Republic advances due to head-to-head result

Group 2

Group 3

Group 4

Spain advances due to a +3 goal difference in games among tied teams (Belgium 0, Northern Ireland −3)

Group 5

Group 6

Switzerland advances due to head-to-head result

Group 7

Second-placed qualifiers
At the end of the elite round, a comparison was made between the second placed teams from all groups. The best second-placed team advanced to the final round, with only the results against the first- and third-ranked teams from each group used to classifying the teams.

References

External links
 – uefa.com

Qualification
UEFA European Under-17 Championship qualification